Johnny Chan (born in Guangzhou, China in 1957) is a Chinese professional poker player. He has won 10 World Series of Poker bracelets, including the 1987 and 1988 World Series of Poker main events consecutively.

Early life
Chan moved with his family in 1962 from Guangzhou to Hong Kong, then in 1968 to Phoenix, Arizona, and later in 1973 to Houston, Texas, where his family owned restaurants. He started playing cards with the staff of the restaurant.

When he was 21, Chan dropped out of the University of Houston, where he was majoring in hotel and restaurant management, and moved to Las Vegas to become a professional gambler.

However, his first live casino experience was before his 21st birthday. During a visit in Las Vegas at the age of 16, Chan managed to buy in for a cash game, allegedly turning $500 into $20,000 in one night, before losing the whole $20,000 the next day.

Poker tournaments

World Series of Poker
Chan won the World Series of Poker (WSOP) in 1987 and 1988 becoming the first foreign national to win the main event. A videotape of the 1988 WSOP final heads-up match is featured in the 1998 movie Rounders, in which Chan makes a cameo appearance. He almost won a third consecutive title, but finished as the runner-up in 1989 to Phil Hellmuth. He is the last player to win back-to-back WSOP Main Events.

In 2005, Chan became the first player to win ten World Series of Poker bracelets, defeating Phil Laak in a $2,500 Pot Limit Texas hold 'em event. He is currently tied with Doyle Brunson and Phil Ivey for second place with 10 World Series of Poker bracelets, behind Phil Hellmuth (16). He was inducted into the Poker Hall of Fame in 2002.

In 2008, Chan cashed for the first time in the Main Event since 1992, earning $32,166 for his 329th-place finish.

In 2010, Chan cashed in the Main Event taking 156th place for $57,102.

Chan's last recorded cash dates back to 2019, when he had a fairly deep run in the WSOP Main Event, eventually busting in 560th place.

World Series of Poker Bracelets

Poker Superstars
Chan competed in the $400,000 Poker Superstars Invitational Tournament in February 2005. He came back from having $20,000 chips out of $3,200,000 in play to finish in second place to Gus Hansen. Chan later competed in Poker Superstars II during the summer of 2005. He defeated 22 players to make it to the finals. He defeated Todd Brunson in the finals after three matches to win the $400,000 first prize. Chan appeared in Poker Superstars III where he made it as far as the semi finals but was defeated by Todd Brunson after three matches.

Poker After Dark 
On NBC's late-night show Poker After Dark, a six-person $20,000 buy-in winner-takes-all tournament, Johnny Chan has the most victories to date with four wins in six appearances. He came in second and fifth when he did not win.

His appearances in which he made it to heads-up were:

WSOP Champions — originally aired January 15–20, 2007 — Won heads-up against Chris Moneymaker
Golden Men — originally aired June 11–16, 2007 — Lost heads-up against Joe Hachem
World Champions — originally aired February 11–16, 2008 — Won heads-up against Phil Hellmuth
International — originally aired February 25 – March 1, 2008 — Won heads-up against Patrik Antonius
Dream Table III — originally aired March 23–27, 2009 — Won heads-up against Jennifer Tilly

Other tournaments
Chan won Bob Stupak's 1981 American Cup poker tournament. He defeated all 9 other players at the final table in less than an hour.  As a result, Stupak gave Chan the nickname "The Orient Express".

Chan has never made a final table on the World Poker Tour (WPT).

Chan played in the 2004 and 2005 World Series of Poker Tournament of Champions events and the National Heads-Up Poker Championship in the same years.

As of 2014, his total live tournament winnings exceed $8,600,000. His 45 WSOP cashes account for $4,355,464  of those winnings.

Personal life 
In addition to playing poker, Chan owns a fast-food franchise in the Las Vegas Stratosphere Hotel and is a consultant for casinos and game makers.  Chan has written for Card Player magazine. He appeared in the first (2006) and 2011 seasons of the GSN series High Stakes Poker.

In 2005, Chan collaborated with Mark Karowe to release Play Poker Like Johnny Chan, an instructional book on several different types of poker. On November 28, 2006, the follow-up titled: Million Dollar Hold'em: Winning Big in Limit Cash Games, which focuses on limit hold'em strategy, was released.

In 2007, Chan launched an online poker room, ChanPokerOnline.com.  It closed in August 2008.

Chan wrote a regular article in the bi-monthly magazine Trader Monthly.

In popular culture
Johnny Chan portrayed himself in the 1998 film Rounders. In a flashback scene, Chan is bluffed out of a pot by the main character Mike McDermott (Matt Damon).

He also appeared in the 2009 Hong Kong movie Poker King as himself.

Notes

References

External links

Goldsea article and interview
PokerListings.com profile

1957 births
American poker players
Hong Kong emigrants to the United States
Living people
Sportspeople from Guangzhou
People from Houston
People from the Las Vegas Valley
Poker After Dark tournament winners
Super Bowl of Poker event winners
University of Houston alumni
World Series of Poker bracelet winners
World Series of Poker Main Event winners
Chinese poker players
American people of Chinese descent
Poker Hall of Fame inductees